Kumara Raja may refer to:

 Kumara Raja (1961 film)
 Kumara Raja (1978 film)